Sarah Felberbaum is an Italian actress.

Life and career 
Born in London to a British mother and an American father of German Jewish descent, Felberbaum moved to Italy with her family when she was a year old. At 15 she started working as a model and appearing in commercials and music videos. In 2000 she hosted the Italian version of the music show Top of the Pops and in 2002 she hosted the Rai 1 talk show Unomattina Estate. She made her acting debut in 2001 in the sitcom Via Zanardi, 33. Active in films, television and on stage, in 2011 she was nominated in the best actress category at the David di Donatello for her performance in The Jewel.

On 26 December 2015 she married A.S. Roma and Italy national football team midfielder Daniele De Rossi in a private ceremony in the Maldives; the couple had been in a relationship since 2011 and have a daughter, Olivia Rose, born on 14 February 2014, and a son, Noah, born on 3 September 2016.

Filmography

Films

Television

Music videos

References

External links 
 

Italian film actresses
Italian television actresses
1980 births
21st-century English women
21st-century English people
21st-century Italian Jews
21st-century Italian actresses
Actresses from London
Association footballers' wives and girlfriends
Living people
American emigrants to Italy
English emigrants to Italy
English people of American descent
British people of American descent
British people of Romanian descent
Italian people of British descent
Italian people of German descent